Næstved Stadium is a multi-use stadium in Næstved, Denmark.  It is known as ProfaGroup Park for sponsorship reasons. It is currently only used for football matches and is the home stadium of Næstved BK (until 1996 Næstved IF). The stadium was earlier used for speedway races as well, often with crowds of around 20,000 or more.

The stadium was opened in 1944 with a capacity of 20,000 spectators. After being renovated in 2002 it now holds 10,000 spectators, including 2,300 covered seats in the main stand.

Renovations

Næstved Stadion has been renovated several times since opening. In 2002 the cinder race track, used for speedway races, around the football field was removed and the pitch moved closer to the main stand. The opposite terrace was rebuilt and moved closer to the field. At the same time the capacity was reduced to around 10,000 - 2,300 of which are covered seats.

Record attendance

The overall record attendance is 21,504 set on September 15, 1950 at an international speedway match.

The record attendance for football is 20,315 spectators, and was set on November 16, 1980 when Næstved IF met Kjøbenhavns Boldklub (KB) in the final and deciding game of the season. With a win Næstved IF would secure the first Danish championship in the club's history. However the visitors scored in the very last minute making the final score 1-1 and thus winning KB their 15th and last ever championship. The club merged with B1903 into FC København in 1992.

Record attendances

References

External links
Entry at Stadions.dk

Næstved BK
Football venues in Denmark
Buildings and structures in Næstved Municipality
Næstved